Colin Bradley is a professor of general practice at University College Cork, best known for his 1995 paper on significant event audit, co-authored with Mike Pringle.

Selected publications 

 “Significant Event Auditing”, co-authored with Bradley C, Carmichael C, Wallis H, Moore A., Occasional Paper 70. London: Royal College of General Practitioners, 1995

References 

British public health doctors
British general practitioners
British medical writers
Year of birth missing (living people)
Living people